The Victoria Jubilee Bridge, also known as Victoria Bridge, is a road bridge carrying Bridge Road (A1130) east west across the River Tees between Stockton and Thornaby in Northern England.
Commonly referred to as the Victoria Bridge, it is located just south east of Stockton town centre and in the town's namesake borough.

Under an 1881 act of Parliament, the bridge was constructed (1882–1887) at a cost of £69,051 by Whitaker Brothers of Leeds,
financed by the local council, a tramway company, North East Railways and the water board, and commemorates the 50th year of the reign of Queen Victoria.

History 

Before the existence of a bridge at this location communication was provided by Bishop's Ferry.
The first bridge was a five arch Stockton (stone) Bridge completed in 1771, designed by Joseph Robson of Sunderland.
This replaced Yarm Bridge as the lowest bridge point on the River Tees and was toll free by 1820.

Design 

The design is a wrought-iron arch bridge by Charles Neate and consulting engineer Harrison Haytor.
The abutments are faced with granite and sandstone and are filled in with large stone rubble.
The deck is carried on buckled plates resting on secondary beams.
The balustrades are cast iron with an open design of interlocking circles, and on the parapets are ornamental cast-iron lampposts carrying modern lights while the spandrels are open cast-iron work with a design of diminishing interlocking circles.

At either side of the bridge are land-based arches that are currently impassable on the upriver side.
These were designed to allow horse-drawn barges to pass under the bridge.

Construction 

Whitaker Brothers of Leeds began construction in 1882, and completed the bridge in 1887.

Operation 

The bridge was opened on 20 June 1887.
Shortly after the opening the tram system was extended over the bridge, and the bridge was to be used by trams until 1931.
The bridge at this point was the lowest bridge point until the opening of the Transporter Bridge in 1911
and the lowest permanent bridge point until the opening of the Newport Bridge in 1934.
During the second World War a bomb passed through the roadway without exploding
and the bridge still bears shrapnel damage from the time.
The bridge used to carry the A66 and A67 until the Surtees Bridge was built in 1981.
In 2010 the bridge was made a grade II listed building.

References

External links 
 Webpages: Bridges on the Tyne, Structurae
 Google Books: Civil engineering heritage
 Photographs: Flickr
 Historic photographs: This is Stockton on Tees.

Crossings of the River Tees
Bridges completed in 1887
Bridges in County Durham
Bridges in North Yorkshire
Buildings and structures in Stockton-on-Tees
Former toll bridges in England
Thornaby-on-Tees